Talite Liava'a (born 18 July 1971) is a former international representative rugby league footballer who played as a .

Representative career
Liava'a is one of a handful of players to have played in two World Cups, representing Tonga in 1995 and 2000. At the 1995 World Cup he was twenty four and playing for the Litchfield Bears when picked by coach Mike McClennan.

Playing career
After his exposure in England at the 1995 Rugby League World Cup Liava'a signed with the Swinton Lions, playing in the lower divisions of English National Leagues. He returned to Australia, playing for the Balmain Tigers in the National Rugby League in 1998. He was not re-signed for the 1999 season and moved to Mackay. He joined the Auckland Warriors midway through the season and stayed for the 2000 season. At the end of the year he was one of many players not re-signed by the new owners.

He later played for Perpignan in France.

References

1971 births
Living people
Balmain Tigers players
Expatriate rugby league players in Australia
Expatriate rugby league players in England
Expatriate rugby league players in New Zealand
New Zealand Warriors players
Place of birth missing (living people)
Rugby league props
Swinton Lions players
Tonga national rugby league team players
Tongan expatriate rugby league players
Tongan expatriate sportspeople in Australia
Tongan expatriate sportspeople in England
Tongan expatriate sportspeople in New Zealand
Tongan rugby league players